The United Reformed Church (formerly the Providence Chapel) is a 19th-century church and a Grade II* Listed building in Barton-upon-Humber, North Lincolnshire, England. It is the oldest surviving Independent chapel in Lincolnshire.

Architecture
The church and its associated manse is constructed of locally-made red brick. It is a two-storey building with a gabled roof. The roof is tiled in Welsh slate and pantiles. A circular panel in the front elevation is inscribed 'Providence Chapel 1806', over which it is painted 'United Reformed Church'. A flat-roofed porch was added in 1859–1864.

The interior retains elaborate plasterwork decoration and a nearly intact series of original box pews. It is the oldest surviving independent chapel in Lincolnshire with its original seating intact.

History
The church was constructed in 1806 and closed in  1993.

References

1806 establishments in England
Buildings and structures in Lincolnshire
Grade II* listed buildings in North Lincolnshire
Barton-upon-Humber
United Reformed churches in England
Grade II* listed churches in Lincolnshire